Christopher Martin (born December 19, 1960) is a retired American football linebacker. He played in the National Football League for the New Orleans Saints, the Minnesota Vikings, the Kansas City Chiefs, and the Los Angeles Rams.

1960 births
Living people
Sportspeople from Huntsville, Alabama
Players of American football from Alabama
American football linebackers
Auburn Tigers football players
New Orleans Saints players
Minnesota Vikings players
Kansas City Chiefs players
Los Angeles Rams players